Reel-to-reel audio tape recording, also called open-reel recording, is magnetic tape audio recording in which the recording tape is spooled between reels. To prepare for use, the supply reel (or feed reel) containing the tape is placed on a spindle or hub. The end of the tape is manually pulled from the reel, threaded through mechanical guides and over a tape head assembly, and attached by friction to the hub of the second, initially empty takeup reel. All standard tape speeds are derived as a binary submultiple of 30 inches per second.

By writing the same audio signal across more tape, reel-to-reel systems give much greater fidelity at the cost of much larger tapes. In spite of the relative inconvenience and generally more expensive media, reel-to-reel systems developed in the early 1940s remained popular in audiophile settings into the 1980s and have re-established a specialist niche in the 21st century. 

Studer, Stellavox, Tascam, and Denon produced reel-to-reel tape recorders into the 1990s, but , only Mechlabor continues to manufacture analog reel-to-reel recorders. , there were two companies manufacturing magnetic recording tape: ATR Services of York, Pennsylvania, and Recording the Masters in Avranches, France.

Reel-to-reel tape was used in early tape drives for data storage on mainframe computers and in video tape recorders. Magnetic tape was also used to record data signals from analytical instruments, beginning with the hydrogen bomb testing of the early 1950s.

History

The reel-to-reel format was used in first magnetic recording system, wire recording and then in the earliest tape recorders, including the pioneering German-British Blattnerphone (1928) machines of the late 1920s which used steel tape, and the German Magnetophon machines of the 1930s. Originally, this format had no name, since all forms of magnetic tape recorders used it. The name arose only with the need to distinguish it from the several kinds of tape cartridges or cassettes such as the endless loop cartridge developed for radio station commercials and spot announcements in 1954, the full-size cassette, developed by RCA in 1958 for home use, as well as the compact cassette developed by Philips in 1962, originally for dictation.

The earliest machines produced distortion during the recording process which German engineers significantly reduced during the Nazi Germany era by applying a DC bias signal to the tape. In 1939, one machine was found to make consistently better recordings than other ostensibly identical models, and when it was taken apart a minor flaw was noticed. Instead of DC, it was introducing an AC bias signal to the tape, and this was quickly adapted to new models using a high-frequency AC bias that has remained a part of audio tape recording to this day. The quality was so greatly improved that recordings surpassed the quality of most radio transmitters, and such recordings were used by Adolf Hitler to make broadcasts that appeared to be live while he was safely away in another city.

American audio engineer Jack Mullin was a member of the U.S. Army Signal Corps during World War II. His unit was assigned to investigate German radio and electronics activities, and in the course of his duties, a British Army counterpart mentioned the Magnetophons being used by the allied radio station in Bad Nauheim near Frankfurt. He acquired two Magnetophon recorders and 50 reels of I.G. Farben recording tape and shipped them home. Over the next two years, he worked to develop the machines for commercial use, hoping to interest the Hollywood film studios in using magnetic tape for movie soundtrack recording.

Mullin gave a demonstration of his recorders at MGM Studios in Hollywood in 1947, which led to a meeting with Bing Crosby, who immediately saw the potential of Mullin's recorders to pre-record his radio shows. Crosby invested $50,000 in a local electronics company, Ampex, to enable Mullin to develop a commercial production model of the tape recorder. Using Mullin's tape recorders, and with Mullin as his chief engineer, Crosby became the first American performer to master commercial recordings on tape and the first to regularly pre-record his radio programs on the medium.

Ampex and Mullin subsequently developed commercial stereo and multitrack audio recorders, based on the system originally invented by Ross Snyder of Ampex Corporation for their high-speed scientific instrument data recorders. Les Paul had been given one of the first Ampex Model 200A tape decks by Crosby in 1948, and ten years later ordered one of the first Ampex eight-track "Sel Sync" machines for multitracking. Ampex engineers, who included Ray Dolby on their staff at the time, went on to develop the first practical videotape recorders in the early 1950s to pre-record Crosby's TV shows.

Inexpensive reel-to-reel tape recorders were widely used for voice recording in the home and in schools, along with dedicated models expressly made for business dictation. When the Philips compact cassette was introduced in 1963 it gradually took over and cassettes eventually displaced reel-to-reel recorders for consumer use. However, the narrow tracks and slow recording speeds used in cassettes compromised fidelity and so Ampex produced pre-recorded reel-to-reel tapes for consumers of popular and classical music from the mid-1950s to the mid-'70s, as did Columbia House from 1960 to 1984.

Following the example set by Bing Crosby, large reel-to-reel tape recorders rapidly became the main recording format used by audiophiles and professional recording studios until the late 1980s when digital audio recording techniques began to allow the use of other types of media (such as Digital Audio Tape (DAT) cassettes and hard disks).

Even today, some artists of all genres prefer analog tape, claiming it is more "musical" or "natural" sounding than digital processes, despite its inaccuracies. Due to harmonic distortion, bass can thicken up, creating a fuller-sounding mix. High-end frequencies can be slightly compressed. Tape saturation is a unique form of distortion that many artists find satisfying. Though with modern technology, these forms of distortion can be simulated digitally, It is not uncommon for some artists to record directly onto digital equipment and then re-record the tracks to analog reel tape or vice versa.

The great practical advantage of tape for studios was twofold: it allowed a performance to be recorded without the 30-minute time limitation of a phonograph disc, and it permitted a recorded performance to be edited or erased and re-recorded again and again on the same piece of media without any waste. For the first time, audio could be manipulated as a physical entity, and the recording process was greatly economized by eliminating the requirement for a highly trained disc-cutting engineer to be present at every recording session. Once a tape machine was installed and calibrated, there was no need for any attendant engineering, other than to spool or replace the tape being used on it. Daily maintenance consisted of cleaning and occasionally demagnetizing the heads and guides.

Tape editing is performed simply by cutting the tape at the required point and rejoining it to another section of tape using adhesive tape, or sometimes glue. This is called a splice. The adhesive tape used in splicing has to be very thin to avoid impeding the tape's motion, and the adhesive is carefully formulated to avoid leaving a sticky residue on the tape or deck. Butt splices (cut at exactly 90 degrees to the tape travel) are used for fast edits from one sound to another, though preferably, the splice is made at a much lower angle across the tape so that any transitional noise introduced by the cut is spread across a few milliseconds of the recording. The low-angle splice also helps to glide the tape more smoothly through the machine and push any loose dirt or debris to the side of the tape path, instead of accumulating in the splice joint. A side-effect of cutting the tape at an angle is that on stereo tapes the edit occurs on one channel a split-second before the other. Long, angled splices can also be used to create a perceptible dissolve from one sound to the next; periodic segments can induce rhythmic or pulsing effects. The use of reels to supply and collect the tape makes it easy for editors to manually move the tape back and forth across the heads to find the exact point they wished to edit. Tape to be spliced is clamped in a splicing block attached to the deck near the heads to hold the tape accurately while the edit is made.

The performance of tape recording is greatly affected by the width of the tracks and the speed of the tape. The wider and faster the better, but of course this uses more tape. These factors lead directly to improved frequency response, signal-to-noise ratio, and high-frequency distortion figures. Tape can accommodate multiple parallel tracks, allowing not just stereo recordings, but multitrack recordings too. This gives the producer of the final edit much greater flexibility, allowing a performance to be remixed long after the performance was originally recorded. This innovation was a great driving force behind the explosion of popular music in the late 1950s and 1960s. 

It was discovered that special effects were possible, such as phasing and flanging, delays and echo by re-directing the signal through one or more additional tape machines, while recording the composite result to another. These innovations appeared on pop recordings shortly after multi-tracking recorders were introduced, although, Les Paul had been using tape echo and speed-manipulation effects on his single-track recordings from the 1940s and '50s.

For home use, simpler reel-to-reel recorders were available, and a number of track formats and tape speeds were standardized to permit interoperability and prerecorded music.

Reel-to-reel tape editing also gained cult status when many used this technique on hit singles in the 1980s.

There has recently been a revival of reel-to-reel, with quite a few companies restoring vintage units and some manufacturing new tape. In 2018, the first new reel-to-reel tape player in over 20 years was released.

Pre-recorded tapes

The first prerecorded reel-to-reel tapes were introduced in the United States in 1949; the catalog contained fewer than ten titles with no popular artists. In 1952, EMI started selling pre-recorded tapes in Great Britain. The tapes were two-sided and mono (2 tracks) and were duplicated in real time on modified EMI BTR2 recorders. RCA Victor joined the reel-to-reel business in 1954. In 1955, EMI released 2-track stereosonic tapes, although the catalog took longer to be published. Since these EMI tapes were much more expensive than a vinyl LP record, sales were poor; still, EMI released over 300 stereosonic titles.

The heyday of prerecorded reel-to-reel tapes was the mid-1960s, but after the introduction of less complicated cassette tapes and 8-track tapes, the number of albums released on prerecorded reel-to-reel tape dropped dramatically despite their superior sound quality. By the latter 1960s, their retail prices were considerably higher than competing formats, and musical genres were limited to those most likely to appeal to well-heeled audiophiles willing to contend with the cumbersome threading of open-reel tape. The introduction of the Dolby noise-reduction system narrowed the performance gap between cassettes and reel-to-reel, and by 1976 prerecorded reel-to-reel offerings had almost completely disappeared, even from record stores and audio equipment shops. Columbia House advertisements in 1978 showed that only one-third of new titles were available on reel-to-reel; they continued to offer a select number of new releases in the format until 1984.

Sales were very low and specialized during the 1980s. Audiophile reel tapes were made under license by Barclay-Crocker between 1977 and 1986. Licensors included Philips, Deutsche Grammophon, Argo, Vanguard, Musical Heritage Society and L'Oiseau Lyre. Barclay-Crocker tapes were all Dolby encoded and some titles were also available in the dbx format. The majority of the catalog contained classical recordings, with a few jazz and movie soundtrack albums. Barclay-Crocker tapes were duplicated on modified Ampex 440 machines at four times the playback speed, unlike popular reel tapes which were duplicated at 16 times the playback speed.

Pre-recorded reel-to-reel tapes are also available once again, albeit somewhat expensively as a very high-quality audiophile product, through "The Tape Project", as well as several other independent studios and record labels. Since 2007, The Tape Project has released their own albums, as well as previously-released albums under license from other labels, on open-reel tape. The German label Analogue Audio Association has also re-released albums on open-reel tape to the high-end audiophile market.

Tape speeds
In general, the faster the speed, the better the reproduction quality. Higher tape speeds spread the signal longitudinally over more tape area, reducing the effects of dropouts that can be audible from the medium, and noticeably improve high-frequency response. Slower tape speeds conserve tape and are useful in applications where sound quality is not critical.

 : used for very long-duration recordings (e.g. recording a radio station's entire output in case of complaints, aka "logging").
 : usually the slowest domestic speed, best for long-duration speech recordings. Compact Tape Cassettes typically operate at this speed.
 : common domestic speed, used on most single-speed domestic machines, reasonable quality for speech and off-air radio recordings.
 : highest domestic speed, also slowest professional; used by most radio stations for "dubs", copies of commercial announcements. Through the early to mid 1990s, many stations could not handle .
 : professional music recording and radio programming.
 : used where the best possible treble response and lowest noise-floor are demanded, though bass response might suffer.

Speed units of inches per second or in/s are also abbreviated IPS.  in/s and  in/s are the speeds that were used for (the vast majority of) consumer market releases of commercial recordings on reel-to-reel tape.  in/s is also the speed used in 8-track cartridges.  in/s is also the speed used in Compact cassettes.

The need for a high linear tape speed was made unnecessary with the introduction of the now-obsolete professional Quadruplex system in 1956 by Ampex, which segmented the fields of a television image by recording (and reproducing) several tracks at a high-speed across the width of the tape per field of video by way of a vertically spinning headwheel with 4 separate video heads mounted on its edge (a technique called transverse scanning), allowing for the linear tape speed to be much slower. Eventually, transverse scanning was accompanied by the later (and less-expensive) technology of helical scanning, which could record one whole field of video per helically-recorded track, recorded at a much lower angle across the width of the tape by the head spinning in the near-horizontal plane, instead of vertically.

Quality aspects
Even though a recording on tape may have been made at studio quality, tape speed was the limiting factor, much like bit rate is today. Decreasing the speed of analog audio tape causes a uniform decrease in the linearity of the frequency response, increased background noise (hiss), more noticeable dropouts where there are flaws in the magnetic tape, and shifting of the (Gaussian) background noise spectrum toward lower frequencies (where it sounds more "granular") regardless of the audio content. An MP3 of a noisy rock band at a low bit rate will have many more artifacts than a simple flute solo at the same bit rate, whereas either on low-speed tape will have the same uniform background noise profile and high-frequency saturation (weakened high-end response). A recording on magnetic audio tape is linear; unlike today's digital audio, not only was jumping from spot to spot to edit time-consuming, but editing was also destructive—unless the recording was duplicated before edit, normally taking the same amount of time to copy, in order to preserve 75-90 percent of the quality of the original. Editing was done either with a razor blade—by physically cutting and splicing the tape on a metal splicing block, in a manner similar to motion picture film editing—or electronically by dubbing segments onto an edit tape. The former method preserved the full quality of the recording but not the intact original; the latter incurred the same quality loss involved in dubbing a complete copy of the source tape but preserved the original.

Tape speed is not the only factor affecting the quality of the recording. Other factors affecting quality include track width, oxide formulation, and backing material and thickness. The design and quality of the recorder are also important factors, in many ways that are not applicable to digital recording systems. The machine's speed stability (wow-and-flutter), head gap size, head quality, and general head design and technology, and the machine's alignment (mostly a maintenance issue, but also a matter of design—how well and precisely it can be aligned) electro-mechanically affect the quality of the recording. The regulation of tape tension affects contact between the tape and the heads and has a very significant impact on the recording and reproduction of high frequencies. The track width of the machine, which is a question of format rather than individual machine design, is one of two major machine factors controlling signal-to-noise ratio (assuming the electronics have high enough S/N ratio not to be a factor), the other being tape speed. S/N ratio varies directly with track width, due to the Gaussian nature of tape noise; doubling the track width doubles the S/N ratio (hence, with good electronics and comparable heads, 8-track cartridges should have half the signal-to-noise ratio of quarter-track " tape at the same speed,  ips.)

Tape formulation affects the retention of the magnetic signal, especially high frequencies, the frequency linearity of the tape, the S/N ratio, print-through, optimum AC bias level (which must be set by a technician aligning the machine to match the tape type used, or more crudely set with a switch to approximate the optimum setting.) Tape formulation varies between different tape types (ferric oxide [Fe2O3], chromium dioxide [CrO2], etc.) and also in the precise composition of a specific brand and batch of tape. (Studios therefore generally align their machines for one brand and model number of tape and use only that brand and model.) Backing material type and thickness affect the tensile strength and elasticity of the tape, which affect wow-and-flutter and tape stretch; stretched tape will have a pitch error, possibly fluctuating. Backing thickness also affects print-through, the phenomenon of adjacent layers of tape wound on a reel picking up weak copies of the magnetic signal from each other. Print-through on analog tape causes unintended pre- and post-echoes on playback, and is generally not fully reversible once it has occurred. In professional half-track use, post-echo is considered less problematic than pre-echo (as the echo is largely masked by the signal itself) and therefore tapes stored for long periods are kept "tails-out", where the tape must be first wound "backwards" onto the take-up spool before playback.

Another quality aspect, not related to audio quality, is the backing material. Typically, acetate was used for cheaper tape, and Mylar for more expensive tape. Acetate would tend to break under conditions that Mylar would survive, though possibly stretch. The quality of the oxide's binder was also important, for it was common with old tape for the backing to wind on the reel, while the oxide falls off.

In the 1980s, several manufacturers produced certain tape formulations blending polyurethane and polyester as backing material which tended to absorb humidity over many years in storage and partially deteriorate. This problem would only be discovered after an archived tape was opened and required to be played again, after possibly a decade or less on the shelf. The deterioration resulted in a softening of the backing material, making it gooey and sticky which quickly clogged-up tape guides and heads of the reproducer. This phenomenon is known as "Sticky-Shed Syndrome" and can be temporarily reversed by baking the tape at a low temperature for several hours to dry it out and restore firmness. The restored tape may then be played normally for several days or weeks, but will eventually return to a deteriorated state again.

Noise reduction
Electronic noise reduction techniques were also developed to increase the signal-to-noise ratio and dynamic range of analog sound recordings. Dolby noise reduction includes a suite of standards (designated A, B, C, S and SR) for both professional and consumer recording. The Dolby systems use frequency-dependent compression/expansion (companding) during the recording/playback, respectively. Initially, Dolby was offered via a stand-alone box that would go between a recorder and amplifier.  Later audio devices often included Dolby.  DBX is another noise reduction system that uses a more aggressive companding technique to improve both dynamic range and noise level. However, DBX recordings do not sound acceptable when played on non-DBX equipment.

In the late 1970s, there was also the German Telefunken-made High Com NR system, a broadband compander, which was technically very advanced. That was a gain in dynamics of roughly 25 dB that outperformed the well-known Dolby B by far. High Com was included in more sophisticated cassette recorders, mostly alongside the various Dolby systems. Even though this applied to the consumer market, there was no tape hiss at all that an ear could realize. Another advantage was that recorded tapes could be exchanged amongst High Com recorders without any loss of quality in sound. The "pumping effect" mostly reported from critical sound material (e.g. drums or any percussive instrument) with advanced dbx NR did not show in properly calibrated High Com recordings. It did not penetrate the market, possibly due to the less aggressive marketing strategies typical for German companies at that time compared to the widely known Dolby systems.

Dolby B eventually became the most popular system for Compact Cassette noise reduction. Today Dolby SR is in widespread use for professional analog tape recording.

Multitrack recorders

As studio audio production progressed and became more and more advanced, it became desirable to record the individual instruments and human voices separately and mix them down to one, two, or more speaker channels later, rather than in real time in the studio before recording. In addition to allowing recording engineers and producers to experiment with different mixing arrangements, effects, etc. on the same performance and to produce multiple versions of a recording (without having multiple duplicates of all the studio control room equipment used for mixing), multi-tracking enables the use of non-real-time effects or effects that cannot be produced in the same studio where the musicians perform. Another huge benefit of multitrack production is that recording of individual tracks or certain instruments could be done at different locations at any later date, if required. This allowed a producer to record basic tracks at a given studio, then take that tape to any other studio in the world that used the same format, and record additional tracks as needed for the same piece of music.

Reel-to-reel recorders with eight, sixteen, twenty-four, and even thirty-two tracks were eventually built, with as many heads recording synchronized parallel linear tracks. A single new reel of 1" or wider tape, could easily cost $200 to $400. Still, in professional studios, most tapes were recorded only once, and all recording was on new tape, to ensure the maximum quality, as studio time and the time of skilled musicians was much higher than the cost of tape, making it not worth the risk of a recording being lost or degraded due to using media that had been previously recorded upon.

If more than 24 tracks of recording were required, it was possible in the mid-1970s and onwards with advanced servo-controlled machines to synchronize two (or more) 24-track recorders to behave as a single 48-track recorder (46 usable tracks due to the time code stripped on the first channel of each tape). Such precise synchronization was achieved by recording a time code on one of the tracks on each reel of tape: a computer system would keep the two time codes perfectly synchronized, and transparently as seen by the machine operator.

Digital reel-to-reel
As professional audio evolved from analog magnetic tape to digital media, engineers adapted magnetic tape technology to digital recording, producing digital reel-to-reel magnetic tape machines. Before large hard disks became economical enough to make hard disk recorders viable, studio digital recording meant recording on digital tape. Mitsubishi's ProDigi and Sony's Digital Audio Stationary Head (DASH) were the primary digital reel-to-reel formats in use in recording studios from the early 1980s through the mid-1990s. Nagra introduced digital reel-to-reel tape recorders for use in film sound recording. Digital reel-to-reel tape eliminated all the traditional quality limitations of analog tape, including background noise (hiss), high frequency roll-off, wow and flutter, pitch error, nonlinearity, print-through, and degeneration with copying, but the tape media was even more expensive than professional analog open reel tape, and the linear nature of tape still placed restrictions on access, and winding time to find a particular spot was still a significant drawback. Also, while the quality of digital tape did not progressively degrade with use of the tape, the physical sliding of the tape over the heads and guides meant that the tape still did wear, and eventually that wear would lead to digital errors and permanent loss of quality if the tape was not copied before reaching that point. Still, digital reel-to-reel tape represented a significant advance in audio recording technology, and most who could afford to record using digital tape generally did. 3M's 32-track recorder was priced at $115,000 in 1978.

Best known for its lines of tape media and professional analog recorders, with its M series of multitrack and 2-track machines, the Mincom division of 3M spent several years developing a digital recording system, including two years of joint research with the BBC. The result was the 3M Digital Audio Mastering System, which consisted of a 32-track deck (16-bit, 50 kHz audio) running 1-inch tape and a 4-track, 1/2-inch mastering recorder.

The extremely short wavelengths recorded by a digital tape recorded meant that tape and tape transport cleanliness was an important issue. Specks of dust or dirt were large enough in relation to the signal wavelengths that contamination by such dirt could render a recording unplayable. Advanced digital error correction systems, without which the system would have been unworkable, still failed to cope with poorly maintained tape or recorders, and for this reason a number of tapes made in the early years of digital reel-to-reel recorders are now useless.

Because digital audio recording technology advanced over the years, with development of cassette-based tape recording formats (such as DAT) and tapeless recording, digital reel-to-reel audio recording is now obsolete, also because no new metal particle reel tapes for digital audio recording are manufactured today - only ferric oxide tapes for analog recording.

As a musical instrument

Early reel-to-reel users learned to manipulate segments of tape by splicing them together and adjusting playback speed or direction of recordings. Just as modern keyboards allow sampling and playback at different speeds, a reel-to-reel recorder could accomplish similar tasks in the hands of a talented user.
 In the late 1940s, Les Paul began experimenting with creating a virtual dance band or jazz ensemble, from his solo guitar accompanying his wife, vocalist Mary Ford, by "bouncing" or overdubbing from one tape machine to another multiple times, layering new vocal or instrument parts on top of previously recorded tracks. While this had been done in the past using phonograph discs, that process was cumbersome and resulted in degraded audio quality after only one or two overdubs. A disc had to be discarded if there was any mistake, but tape was reuseable. Magnetic tape recording allowed Paul to shift instrument sounds to higher or lower octaves by manipulating the speed of the tape while recording his guitar. He used tape echo to enhance ambience or create a special effect. Paul and Mary Ford produced many popular recordings over the next two decades using these techniques. One of their most famous was "How High the Moon".
 In 1958, Ross Bagdasarian, aka David Seville, recorded his voice at one-half normal speed, raising its pitch a full octave when played back at normal speed, to create the early rock and roll novelty song Witch Doctor. He later used the same technique, plus overdubbing his voice three times, to create Alvin and the Chipmunks. Many other creators of novelty, comedy, and children's records, such as Sheb Wooley, Sascha Burland, and Ray Stevens have since used this process.
 The mellotron is an electro-mechanical, polyphonic tape replay keyboard that used a bank of parallel linear magnetic audio tape strips. Playback heads underneath each key enable the playing of pre-recorded sounds. Each of the tape strips has a playing time of approximately eight seconds, after which the tape comes to a dead stop and rewinds to the start position.
 The title track of Jimi Hendrix's album Are You Experienced, on which the guitar solo and much of the drum track was recorded, then played backwards on a reel-to-reel.
 The Beatles recorded many songs using reel-to-reel tape as a creative tool. Examples include "Being for the Benefit of Mr. Kite" and "Yellow Submarine" which cut up stock recordings and then randomly spliced and overdubbed them into the songs (recordings of calliope organs on "Mr. Kite", and recordings of marching bands on "Yellow Submarine"). On "Tomorrow Never Knows" multiple tape machines were interconnected to play tape loops that had been prepared by the band. The loops were played backward, sped up or slowed down. To record the song, the tape machines, located in separate rooms, were manned by technicians and played together to record on the fly. "Strawberry Fields Forever" combined two different taped versions of the song. The versions were independently altered in speed to end up together miraculously both on pitch and tempo. "I Am the Walrus" used a radio tuner patched into the sound console to layer a random live broadcast over an existing taped track. "Revolution 9" also had effects produced using a reel-to-reel with tape editing techniques.
 The BBC Radiophonic Workshop and Delia Derbyshire arranged and "realised" the original theme to the BBC series Doctor Who by recording various sounds including oscillators and then manually cutting together each individual note on a group of reel-to-reels.
 The British rock band 10cc created a human harmonium of sorts on a 16-track tape recorder by overdubbing their own voices many dozens of times, singing only a single note each time. The cumulative result was a total of 630 voices spread evenly over an octave-and-a-half of proper musical scale notes, with each of the distinct notes assigned to an individual track of the tape. When played back, any track (or note) could be faded in and out manually on a mixing console arranged like a piano keyboard, to simulate an immense virtual choir. This effect provided the atmospheric backing instrumentation for their song "I'm Not in Love".
 Argentine blues guitarist Claudio Gabis, needing an amplifier for his electric guitar, used a modified Geloso recorder as a distortion device for his debut album Manal of 1970. This was achieved by injecting a signal and letting it "record under vacuum" (without tape, recording infinitely). The amplified signal thus obtained could be distorted by considerably increasing the volume. Also the first single of the group "Qué pena me das", has an abrupt ending with tapes passed upside down.
 Aaron Dilloway, founding member of Wolf Eyes, often utilizes a reel-to-reel tape machine in his solo performances.
 Yamantaka Eye of the band Boredoms uses a reel-to-reel tape as an instrument in live performances and in post-production (an example is the track "Super You" from the album Super æ).
 Mission of Burma member Martin Swope played a reel-to-reel tape recorder live, either playing previously recorded samples at certain times or recording part of the band's performance and playing it back either in reverse or at different speeds. When the band re-formed in 2002, audio engineer Bob Weston took over Swope's role at the tape deck.
 Musique concrète in general.
 Pink Floyd's cash register introduction to their track "Money" was made using a loop of spliced tape which was looped around a mic stand and through a tape player.
 Steve Tibbetts is a recording artist who includes tape editing as a significant portion of the creative process.
 Frank Zappa's Lumpy Gravy, We're Only in It for the Money and Uncle Meat, featured numerous edits, and multiple instances of speed alteration and intricately layered samples upon samples.
 The improviser Jerome Noetinger uses a ReVox A77 reel-to-reel to create and manipulate tape loops in live performance.
In addition, multiple reel-to-reel machines used in tandem can also be used to create echo and delay effects. The Frippertronics configuration used by Brian Eno and Robert Fripp on their 1970s and '80s recordings illustrates these possibilities.

See also
 Audio format
 Audio storage
 Audio tape length and thickness
 Multitrack recording
 Sound recording and reproduction
 Magnetophon

Notes

References

External links
Magnetic tape technology (in German)
 A history of magnetic recording, BBC/H2G2
 David Winter's 1950s EMI tape list
 David Winter's Barclay Crocker tape list
 Documentary sound recordist discusses his work using a Nagra reel to reel tape recorder on documentary production

Audiovisual introductions in 1928
Audio storage
German inventions
Tape recording

fr:Magnétophone
ru:Магнитная звукозапись